Vietnam awards and decorations are specified by the National Assembly of Vietnam through Law on Emulation and Commendation (No: 15/2003/QH11). 
By this law, emulation aims to create a motive force to mobilize, attract and encourage all individuals and collectives to promote their patriotic tradition, dynamism and creativity in striving to well accomplish the assigned tasks for the objective of a prosperous people, a strong country, an equitable, democratic and civilized society. 
Commendation forms include: Order; State honorable title.

State Honorable Titles
State honorable titles shall be awarded or posthumously awarded to individuals and awarded to collectives that have made exceptionally outstanding contributions to the cause of national construction and defense:

Orders
Orders shall be conferred or posthumously conferred on individuals and conferred on collectives that have rendered meritorious services, recorded regular or unexpected achievements, contributing to the cause of national construction and defense.

Medals
Medals shall be awarded to officers, professional armymen, defense workers working in agencies and units of the People's Army; officers, professional non-commissioned officers working in agencies and units of the People's Police, and foreigners who have, for a period of time, devoted and/or made contributions to the cause of national construction and defense.

See also 
 Vietnam People's Navy
 Vietnam People's Air Force
 Vietnam Border Defense Force
 Vietnam Marine Police
 List of military decorations
 Socialist orders of merit

References

External links 
 

Orders, decorations, and medals of Vietnam
Military awards and decorations of Vietnam